Jan van der Jagt  (30 May 1924 in Rotterdam – 4 August 2001 in Arnhem) was a Dutch politician and architect.

Van der Jagt was a member of the provincial parliament of Gelderland from 1974 to 1977, Party chair of the Reformed Political League (Gereformeerd Politiek Verbond) from 1976 to 1984, and a Senator from 1977 to 1981, and also from 1983 to 1991.

He was made Knight in the Order of the Netherlands Lion on 11 June 1991.

References 
  Parlement.com biography

Members of the Senate (Netherlands)
Party chairs of the Netherlands
1924 births
2001 deaths
Members of the Provincial Council of Gelderland
Politicians from Rotterdam
Reformed Churches (Liberated) Christians from the Netherlands
Reformed Political League politicians
Knights of the Order of the Netherlands Lion
20th-century Dutch architects
20th-century Dutch politicians
Architects from Rotterdam